Emma Kilkelly is a camogie player, a member of the Galway senior panel that unsuccessfully contested the All Ireland finals of 2010 and 2011 against Wexford,

Other awards
1 Minor All- Ireland, one All Ireland Junior, one All Ireland Intermediate, Junior and Senior Connacht Colleges Titles.

References

External links
 Camogie.ie Official Camogie Association Website

1986 births
Living people
Galway camogie players